The Democratic Party of Iranian Kurdistan (PDKI; , HDKA), also known as the Kurdish Democratic Party of Iran (KDPI), is an armed leftist ethnic party of Kurds in Iran, exiled in northern Iraq. It is banned in Iran and thus not able to operate openly.

The group calls for self-determination of Kurdish people and has been described as seeking either separatism or autonomy within a federal system.
 
Since 1979, KDPI has waged a persistent guerrilla war against the Government of the Islamic Republic of Iran. This included the 1979–1983 Kurdish insurgency, its 1989–1996 insurgency and recent clashes in 2016.

Islamic Revolutionary Guard Corps officials have called the party a terrorist organization.

Hyeran Jo of Texas A&M University classifies KDPI as "compliant rebels", i.e. rebels that kill fewer than 100 and refrain from killing for more than half of their operating years. According to Jo, in order to gain domestic and international legitimacy, the KDPI denounces violence against civilians, claiming commitment to the Universal Declaration of Human Rights and Geneva Convention Article 3, and as of 2007 is one of the signatories to the Geneva Call's ban on anti-personnel mines.

History

Early years 
Qazi Muhammad founded the PDKI in Mahabad, Iran, on 16 August 1945. On 22 January 1946, Qazi Muhammad declared a Kurdish Republic of Kurdistan, of which he formally became president. The Republic lasted less than a year: after the USSR retreated from the area, the Imperial Iranian army first reclaimed Iranian Azerbaijan, followed by Mahabad on 15 December 1946. After the fall of the Republic, many of the PDKI leaders were arrested and executed, effectively ending the party.

Against the Shah 
The PDKI cooperated with the Tudeh party and saw a short revival under the anti-Shah administration of Mohammad Mosaddegh (1951–53), but this ended after Shah Mohammad Reza Pahlavi took full control again in the 1953 Iranian coup d'état. In 1958, the PDKI was on the verge of unifying with the Iraqi Kurdistan Democratic Party (KDP), but was then dismantled by the SAVAK secret police. The remains of the PDKI continued to support the KDP, but this changed as the Shah started aiding the KDP, which fought against the Iraqi regime that had overthrown the royal Hashemite dynasty. In return for the Shah's aid, the KDP decreased its support for the PDKI.

The PDKI reorganised itself, marginalising its pro-KDP leader Abd-Allah Ishaqi (also known as Ahmad Tawfiq), adding new communist and nationalist members, and forming the Revolutionary Committee to continue the struggle against the Iranian regime. The Committee began an unsuccessful revolution in March 1967, ending after 18 months.

After reforms by a new leader, Abdul Rahman Ghassemlou, the PDKI fought alongside Islamic and Marxist movements against the Shah, culminating in the 1979 Iranian Revolution. Khomeini's new Islamic Republic, however, refused the Kurdish demands, suppressing the PDKI and other Kurdish parties. The PDKI continued its activities in exile, hoping to achieve "Kurdish national rights within a democratic federal republic of Iran".

Against the Islamic Republic 
In January 1981, Iraq supported the party in the Iranian cities of Nowdesheh and Qasr-e Shirin and provided weapons supplies to the PKDI. This move was made so as the party stops Tehran from using the Tehran-Baghdad highway. The PKDI hoped as well to establish a level of autonomy in the area. However,  the Iranian forces staged a series of debilitating attacks against the KDPI, leaving them a "marginal military factor during much of the Iran-Iraq War".

In 1997, the party's call for abstaining the presidential election remained largely ignored by Kurdish citizens in Iran and amid a high turnout in Kurdistan Province, a large number voted for Mohammad Khatami.

In 2016, the organization announced it was reviving its armed struggle following death of Farinaz Khosravani and subsequent Mahabad riots.

Mykonos restaurant assassinations
Sadeq Sharafkandi's murder became an international incident between Germany and Iran. On 17 September 1992, PDKI leaders Sadegh Sharafkandi, Fattah Abdoli, Homayoun Ardalan and their translator Nouri Dehkordi were assassinated at the Mykonos Greek restaurant in Berlin, Germany. In the Mykonos trial, the courts found Kazem Darabi, an Iranian national who worked as a grocer in Berlin, and Lebanese Abbas Rhayel, guilty of murder and sentenced them to life in prison. Two other Lebanese, Youssef Amin and Mohamed Atris, were convicted of being accessories to murder. In its 10 April 1997 ruling, the court issued an international arrest warrant for Iranian intelligence minister Hojjat al-Islam Ali Fallahian after declaring that the assassination had been ordered by him with knowledge of Grand Ayatollah Ali Khamenei and President Ayatollah Rafsanjani.

Vienna assassination 
On 13 July 1989, the then PDKI leader Abdul Ghassemlou arrived in Vienna with his delegation to have talks with diplomats, dispatched by Iran, regarding the terms of reconciliation between the central government in Teheran and the Kurds. Those were not the only talks with Iran, held in Vienna. After they entered the conference hall and the talks started, the Iranian “diplomats” took out automatic weapons and murdered all of the members of the Kurdish delegation, including Abdul Ghassemlou.

PDKI congresses
The PDKI has held fifteen congresses. These occurred in 1945, 1964, 1973, 1980, 1982, 1984, 1985, 1988, 1992, 1995, 1997, 2000, 2004, 2008, 2012, and 2018.

During the 20th Congress of the Socialist International, held at the headquarters of the United Nations in New York City (9–11 September 1996), the PDKI was given the status of observer member. In 2005, the PDKI's membership was elevated to consultative status.

Secretaries-General

Qazi Muhammad (1945–1947)
Ahmad Tofiq (1947–1973)
Abdul Rahman Ghassemlou (1973–1989)
Sadegh Sharafkandi (1989–1992)
Abdullah Hasanzadeh (1993–2004)
Mustafa Hijri (2004–)

Military wing

The military wing of the PDKI is named PDKI Pershmerga.

Reunity
Both wings of PDKI and PDK reunited on July 21 2022 and build again Democratic Party of Iranian Kurdistan.

New leading team
The leading team until the joint Congress calls Executive Board. This board has 12 members leading by Mustafa Hijri.
The leading team abroad or Executive Board Abroad has 6 members who are: Kwestan Gadani, Azad Azizi, Mohammad Rasoul Karimi, Aso Saleh, Kaveh Abdali and Rahim Mohammad Zadeh.

See also

References

External links
The PDKI English language homepage

1945 establishments in Iran
Banned political parties in Iran
Banned Kurdish parties
Banned socialist parties
Consultative member parties of the Socialist International
Federalist parties in Iran
Kurdish nationalism in Iran
Kurdish nationalist political parties
Kurdish political parties in Iran
Left-wing militant groups in Iran
Members of the Unrepresented Nations and Peoples Organization
Militant opposition to the Islamic Republic of Iran
Militant opposition to the Pahlavi dynasty
Organisations designated as terrorist by Iran
Parties of one-party systems
Political parties established in 1945
Political parties of the Iranian Revolution
Progressive Alliance
Secularism in Iran
Social democratic parties in Asia
Socialist parties in Iran